Felienne Hermans, Felienne (/Fay-lee-nuh/), is a scientist working at Leiden University as an associate professor. Her research interests include programming education and spreadsheets.

Academic career
Hermans received her MSc in computer science from Eindhoven University of Technology, and her PhD in software engineering in 2013 from Delft University of Technology. Following that she was an assistant professor at Delft University of Technology, heading the Spreadsheet Lab.

Currently Hermans is head of the Programming Education Research Lab (PERL).

Business
Hermans is the founder and former CEO of Infotron, a spinoff company of TU Delft that implements risk assessment software for spreadsheets.

Hermans is active with DigiLeerkracht, the computational thinking teaching by Future.nl, and teaches programming, including one day a week at the Lyceum Kralingen in Rotterdam. 
In addition, Hermans is a referee at the FIRST LEGO League, where children build a robot from LEGO.
 
She was a board member at Devnology Nederland, an organisation for software developers. She is a co-organiser of the yearly conference Joy of Coding.

Outreach
In 2011, Hermans gave a TEDx talk in Delft.
Hermans has given research talks at conferences including StrangeLoop, NDC, GOTO, and DDD Europe, a conference about Domain-driven design. 
Since 2016, she is a host of SE Radio.  

Hermans produced several MOOCs on edX, with topics including programming in Scratch for teachers and children. She self-published an e-book about the creation of games for children.  In 2017, she started a program for Rotterdam elementary students to receive programming lessons. In 2020, Hermans launched the Hedy programming language, to teach children Python in a gradual way.

Awards
Hermans' online data analysis course was awarded the Wharton-QS gold education award for best education innovation project entry in Europe.

Hermans won the SURF Education Award in 2017, SURF being the collaborative ICT organisation for Dutch education and research.

In 2018, the Open Education Consortium awarded her the Open Education Award for Excellence.
Also in 2018, Hermans won the Tech Inspirator Award at the Techionista Awards.

References

Living people
21st-century Dutch businesswomen
21st-century Dutch businesspeople
Dutch women academics
Academic staff of Leiden University
Academic staff of the Delft University of Technology
Delft University of Technology alumni
Eindhoven University of Technology alumni
Dutch women engineers
1984 births